Marco Duravia (born 14 October 1989) is an Italian footballer who plays for ACD PortoMansuè.

Club career

Juventus
Duravia began his career working his way through the Juventus youth ranks , before he made his way to the Primavera youth squad in 2006–07 season.  In July 2008 he was picked for the annual pre-season training with Juventus first team in Pinzolo. At a later time he participated in and won the 12th Birra Moretti Trophy with the first team, and he played the final match against A.C. Milan. In February 2009 he won the 2009 Torneo di Viareggio with the reserve team and  After graduating the youth team in July 2009, he was loaned out to the Lega Pro divisions.

Loan Stints
In July 2009, Duravia was sent to the Lega Pro Prima Divisione on co-ownership deal with Figline, along with teammates Alessandro D'Antoni, Salvatore D'Elia, and Nicola Cosentini. Duravia made 19 league appearances with Figline during the season, and returned to Juventus in June 2010. He was subsequently sold in co-ownership deal during the same year, and was sent to Canavese. He remained with the club until January 2011, having made 13 league appearances during his stay, also scoring two league goals. In January 2011, he was loaned out to Carrarese, where the team won Lega Pro second division promotion playoff. he only played once in the league and 2 out of 4 playoff matches. Juventus gave up the remain 50% registration rights to Canavese in June 2011 but Canavese also released him.

amateur career
In December 2011 returned to his home region Veneto for 2011–12 Serie D club Montebelluna. On 31 August 2012 he was signed by Belluno, however, as a forward.

Duravia joined ACD Portomansué ahead of the 2019/20 season. In June 2021, he moved to Vittorio Falmec. A year later, he moved to Godigese. His departure from the club was confirmed on 28 November 2022. On 6 December 2022, Duravia signed with Galliera.

References

External links
 Football.it Profile 
 
 

Italian footballers
Juventus F.C. players
F.C. Canavese players
Carrarese Calcio players
Calcio Montebelluna players
A.C. Belluno 1905 players
A.C. Trento 1921 players
Clodiense S.S.D. players
A.S.D. Cjarlins Muzane players
Association football fullbacks
People from Castelfranco Veneto
1989 births
Living people
Sportspeople from the Province of Treviso
Footballers from Veneto